Brigitte Voit (born 1963 in Bayreuth)  is a German chemist and professor of chemistry. She holds the chair Organic Chemistry of Polymers at the Faculty of Chemistry of the TU Dresden and is head of the Institute of Macromolecular Chemistry at the Leibniz Institute of Polymer Research (IPF Dresden) in Dresden. From September 1, 2002 to July 31, 2022 she was also member of the Board of Management/CSO of the IPF Dresden.

Academic career 

Voit studied chemistry at the University of Bayreuth (1982–1987) and was awarded her PhD with distinctions in 1990.  During her PhD, she was a visiting researcher at the University of Arizona. After a postdoctoral stay at the Eastman Kodak (now Kodak) research laboratories in Rochester, NY, USA, she received her habilitation from the Technical University of Munich in 1996. In 1997 she accepted a full professorship at the TU Dresden, and simultaneously the position as head of the Institute Macromolecular Chemistry at the Leibniz-Institute of Polymer Research Dresden (IPF Dresden).

She is a principal investigator in two so-called Clusters of Excellence, the "Center for Regenerative Therapies Dresden" (CRTD) and the "Center for Advancing Electronics Dresden" (CfAED), which were distinguished by the German Universities Excellence Initiative. From 2011 to 2017 she acted as a speaker of Section D (Mathematics, Natural Sciences and Engineering) of the Leibniz Association and was a member of the Leibniz board. Since 2015 she chairs the Board of Management of  the Materialforschungsverbund Dresden (MFD - Materials Research Network Dresden).

Voit is a member of the chemistry review board of the Deutsche Forschungsgemeinschaft (DFG) and of the European Research Council (ERC) Evaluation Panel for Starting Grants. She is a board member of several chemistry related scientific journals, for example Angewandte Chemie, and part of the executive advisory board of all macromolecular journals of Wiley.
Also, Brigitte Voit is a board member of a number of foundations, such as the Georg-Manecke foundation of the Gesellschaft Deutscher Chemiker (GDCh) and the Karl Heinz Beckurts foundation, and belongs to the board of trustees of the Federal Institute for Materials Research and Testing and the DECHEMA, the German Society for Chemical Engineering and Biotechnology.

In 2017 she was honored by the "Sächsicher Verdienstorden" (Order of Merit of the Free State of Saxony), and in  2018 she received the Hermann Staudinger Award of the GDCh.

Research 
Brigitte Voit research field comprises different areas of polymer related science. She works on dendrimers and hyperbranched polymers, optical and thermo-sensitive polymer materials, graft and block copolymers, nanostructure formation via controlled polymer synthesis and efficient polymer analogous reactions. She is also interested in responsive and bioactive polymers and hydrogels, and worked on polymers for microelectronics and organic electronics.

Publications 

Voit has published more than 600 articles in peer-reviewed international scientific journals which were cited more than 16000 times, and holds over 35 patents and patent applications.

References

External links 
 Prof. Dr. Brigitte Voit  Leibniz-Institut für Polymerforschung Dresden
 

Academic staff of TU Dresden
Living people
1963 births
21st-century German chemists
21st-century German inventors
University of Bayreuth alumni
German women chemists
Women inventors
Recipients of the Order of Merit of the Free State of Saxony
Technical University of Munich alumni
People from Bayreuth